Kwun Tong is one of the 18 districts of Hong Kong. It is located in Kowloon, and is the easternmost and southernmost district in Kowloon. It had a population of 648,541 in 2016. The district has the second highest population in Hong Kong, after Sha Tin District, while the income is below average. Kwun Tong District borders Sai Kung District to the east, Wong Tai Sin District to the north, and Kowloon City District to the west. To the south is Victoria Harbour, and the Eastern District directly across on Hong Kong Island.

It is the most densely populated district in Hong Kong, at 55,000 per km², but it is also one of the largest industrial areas in Hong Kong. Kwun Tong District is known for its industry, with factories built during the 1950s; they were mainly located in Kowloon Bay, Kwun Tong, and Yau Tong. Since the relocation of the manufacturing industry, Kwun Tong district has seen a rise of commercial buildings, such as APM Millennium City 5. Kwun Tong is served by six stations on the Kwun Tong line: Yau Tong (also on the Tseung Kwan O line), Lam Tin, Kwun Tong, Ngau Tau Kok and Kowloon Bay. 

Pollution, poverty and ageing population remain concerns for the district. According to a statistical figures of 2001, the proportion of poor and elderly people in this district is 22.6% and 15.5% respectively.  Furthermore, the number of poor people living in this district is 124,803, which is the highest in Hong Kong.

Areas
The district consists of the following areas:

 Kwun Tong
 Ngau Tau Kok
 Kowloon Bay
 Sau Mau Ping
 Lam Tin
 Yau Tong and Lei Yue Mun

Features

Industrial area
Kwun Tong District is one of the industrial areas in Hong Kong. The factories had been built since the 1950s. These industrial areas are mainly located in Kowloon Bay, Kwun Tong (to the southwest of Kwun Tong Road), and Yau Tong. Since the importance of manufacturing in Hong Kong is fading out, many factories have been demolished and commercial buildings are being constructed to replace them.

APM Millennium City 5
Opened in Hong Kong in April 2005, APM Millennium City 5 is a commercial property developed by Sun Hung Kai Properties. Together with Millennium Cities 1, 2, 3, and 6, they are commercial properties situated along Kwun Tong Road. apm Millennium City 5 is next to the Kwun Tong station. There is also a 7-storey shopping arcade with an array of restaurants, clothing stores, cosmetics shops, and a cineplex. It also contains a bus terminus and parking facilities.

It is the largest mall in the district, and caters for the habits of the community by having extended operating hours. Its name 'apm' implies that visitors are welcome during day (am) and night (pm). In fact, many shops inside the mall are open overnight. Some retail shops close at 12 midnight, and restaurants close at 2am. There are also stores that operate 24 hours.

Residential area
The residential areas in Kwun Tong are mainly located in Ngau Tau Kok, upper Kwun Tong Central, Sau Mau Ping and Lam Tin.

Around 54% of the population of the Kwun Tong District live in public housing estates, 13% in the Home Ownership Scheme estates, 4% in the Private Sector Participation Scheme estates, and the rest in private housing. With the redevelopment schemes of housing estates being completed successively in recent years, many older estates have been replaced by new ones, and this scenario gives a fresh look to the amenities of the District.

Health care
The supply and demand of medical and health services in Kwun Tong are all very stringent, and especially the accident and emergency services are provided by the United Christian Hospital which is the only hospital in the District equipped with casualty facilities. In the event of accidents and disasters, the injured have to be sent there for emergency medical treatment. In addition, various health services are provided by the Department of Health in the District, including an elderly health centre, a woman health centre, a chest clinic, a child assessment centre, a dermatological clinic, a dental out-patient clinic, a school dental clinic, a social hygiene clinic, two maternal and child health care centres, two methadone clinics and three student health service centres/special assessment centres.

Recreational facilities
There are nine community centres under the District Office, and they are distributed over the 8 sub-districts of the Kwun Tong District. The oldest one is the Kwun Tong Community Centre, which is already 34 years old, while the newest one is the Sai Tso Wan Neighbourhood Community Centre. The construction of the Centre, which was completed in 1993, is the ancillary requirement that Laguna City developer has to fulfil for property development therein.

Transport
Kwun Tong is served by the Kwun Tong line (six stations) and the Tseung Kwan O line (one station) of the MTR metro system.

Major roads that serves the area include:

 Kwun Tong Road
 Kwun Tong Bypass
 Tseung Kwan O Tunnel
 Eastern Harbour Crossing (EHC)

Public transport
 MTR
 Kwun Tong line: Yau Tong, Lam Tin, Kwun Tong, Ngau Tau Kok, Kowloon Bay
 Tseung Kwan O line: Yau Tong
 (franchised) bus
 KMB : 1A, 2A, 2X, 3D, 5D, 5M, 5R, 6D, 6P, 9, 11B, 11C, 11D, 11X, 13D, 13P, 13M, 13X, 14, 14B, 14D, 14H, 14X, 15, 15A, 15X, 16, 16M, 16X, 17, 23, 23M, 24, 26, 26M, 26X, 27, 28, 28B, 28S, 29M, 33, 33B, 38, 38P, 40, 40A, 40P, 42, 42C, 62P, 62X, 69C, 74A, 74B, 74C, 74D, 74E, 74F, 74P, 74X, 80, 80A, 80P, 80X, 83A, 83X, 88, 88X, 89, 89B, 89C, 89D, 89P, 89X, 91, 91M, 91P, 92, 92R, 93A, 93K, 93P, 95, 95M, 98, 98A, 98B, 98C, 98D, 98P, 213A, 213B, 213D, 213M, 213S, 214, 214P, 215P, 215X, 216M, 219X, 224X, 234C, 234D, 252X, 258A, 258D, 258P, 258S, 258X, 259D, 259S, 259X, 267X, 268A, 268C, 268P, 269C, 269S, 274X, 277A, 277E, 277P, 277X, 290, 290A, 290B, 290X, 292P, 293S, 296A, 296C, 296D, 296P, 297, 297P, N3D, N213, N214, N216, N290, N293, T74, T277, X6C, X42C, X42P, X89D
 NWFB : 793, 795X, 796P, 796S, 796X, 797, N796
 Citybus : 22, 22M, 55, 78X, A22, A26, A26P, A29, A29P, E22, E22A, E22C, E22P, E22S, E22X, N26, N29, NA29
 Harbour-crossing routes : 101/R, 107, 108, 111/P, 601/P, 603/A/P/S, 606/A/X, 608/P, 613/A, 619/P/X, 621, 641, 671/X, 690/P, 694, N121, N619, N691
 Minibus / Public Light Bus
 Green Minibus
 to-and-fro Kowloon : 15, 16, 16A, 16B, 16S, 22A, 22M, 23, 23B, 23C, 23M, 24, 34M, 34S, 35, 36A, 46, 47, 48, 49, 50, 51M, 54, 54M, 54S, 56, 59, 60, 63, 68, 69, 71A, 71B, 76A, 76B, 83A, 83M,86, 87, 89A, 89B, 89C, 90A, 90B 
 to-and-fro New Territories : 1, 1A, 1S, 10M, 11, 11S, 12, 12A, 13, 17, 19S, 102, 102B, 102S, 103, 104, 110, 110A, 111, 501S
 Red Minibus
 There are about 28 routes, some travel throughout the district, while others goes to-and-fro Mong Kok, Castle Peak Road, Jordan Road, Hung Hom etc.
 Ferry : Kwun Tong Pier
 Fortune Ferry operates a regular service between Kwun Tong and North Point.
 Coral Sea Ferry operates a regular service between Kwun Tong and Sai Wan Ho.
only full-day operated routes are listed above.

Education
 List of schools in Kwun Tong District

Administration

Government District Officer
Mr Andy Lam

Chairman of Kwun Tong District Council
Mr. Wilson Or Chong-shing, MH

LegCo

In the same constituency with Wong Tai Sin District as "Kowloon East", effective from October 2004:

 Mr. Kam-lam Chan (DAB)
 Mr. Kwok-kin Wong (HKFTU)
 Mr. Alan Kah Kit Leong (Civic Party)
 Mr. Fred Wah-Ming Li (Democratic Party)

Panorama

See also

 List of buildings, sites and areas in Hong Kong

References

External links

 Kwun Tong District Council
 List and map of electoral constituencies (large PDF file) (Archive)

 
New Kowloon